The German occupation of Byelorussia, now known as Belarus, started with Germany's invasion of the Russian Empire on August 1, 1914 and ended with the collapse of the German Empire on November 11, 1918. During the occupation, 130,000 Belarusians were killed.

Mobilization
On the Russian-German front, the war began with battles in East Prussia, Poland, and Galicia. The Lithuanian-Belarusian provinces located near the theater of military operations were declared under martial law. Strikes, meetings, processions, demonstrations were prohibited, military censorship was introduced. The territory of Belarus turned out to be part of the Dvinsky and Minsk military districts, and in accordance with the decree of Nicholas II of July 20, 1914, the entire local civil administration had to obey their superiors. The Headquarters of the Supreme Commander-in-Chief, Grand Duke Nikolai Nikolaevich, was located in Baranovichi. On July 29, by his order, a directive was sent to the chiefs of military districts "to render the most energetic assistance to the civil authorities by military force, in order to eliminate any attempt at unrest at once with the full unity of the military and civilian authorities on the ground."

Life under occupation
During the First World War (1914-1918), the territory of Belarus became the scene of active hostilities. Since the beginning of the war in Baranovichi, and since August 8 (21), 1915 - in Mogilev, the Headquarters of the Supreme Commander was located. In 1915, German troops occupied the western territories of modern Belarus, from which 432 industrial facilities and a number of educational institutions were dismantled or taken to other provinces of Russia by the Russian authorities. Also, 29 enterprises were taken out of the frontline Minsk, Mogilev and Vitebsk provinces, and in the summer of 1915, in areas under threat of occupation, they destroyed crops and stocks of agricultural products with payment of compensation to peasants at state rates. A number of educational institutions were also evacuated from Belarus to Russia and Ukraine. The Belarusian People's Committee was organized in the German-occupied territory.

The war led to inflation and significant use of women and child labor. In frontline regions the civilian population was mobilized for military work (for example, at the end of 1916, 219.3 thousand men and women were mobilized in the Minsk province). The Western lands occupied by the Germans in 1915 (about 50 thousand km2) were divided into the military administrative district of the Ober-Ost, the military operational strip and Brest. The territories occupied in 1915 were subordinated to the German military command, which imposed a number of restrictions on the local population (passports with fingerprints even for children, a system of passes when leaving the place of residence): landlords' estates whose owners fled to Russia were given to the officers of the German army. An occupation currency, the oberost—ruble, was also issued.

The population of the territory occupied in 1915 was taxed - per capita (8 marks in 1917 from a person aged 15 to 60 years), for industry and trade. There were also requisitions of agricultural products, a ban on killing livestock and poultry without special permission (the permit involved the surrender of part of the meat to the authorities). In 1915, forced paid work was introduced for women aged 18-45 and men aged 16-50. In 1915, 7 sawmills started operating in Belovezhskaya Pushcha. At the same time, the German occupation authorities opened a number of Belarusian, Lithuanian and Jewish schools, where the compulsory study of German was also introduced (it was forbidden to teach children in Russian).

Byelorussia after both February and October Revolutions
In March 1917, a congress of Belarusian national organizations was held in Minsk, which put forward demands for the state autonomy of Belarus as part of the Russian Federative Democratic Republic and elected an executive body - the Belarusian National Committee (BNC). In July 1917, a congress of Belarusian organizations and parties was held, instead of the BNC, the Central Rada of Belarusian Organizations was created, reorganized into the Great Belarusian Rada.

On December 5, 1917, the First All-Belarusian Congress began its work, at which issues of Belarusian statehood were discussed. The participants of the congress were divided into supporters of the Great Belarusian Rada (supporters of independence) and the Belarusian Regional Committee (supporters of broad autonomy within Russia). The participants of the Congress made a compromise decision to create an All-Belarusian Council of Peasants', Soldiers' and Workers' deputies. The All-Belarusian Council was to prepare the convocation of the Constituent Assembly to resolve the issue of the state structure of Belarus. However, already on December 18, the Council of People's Commissars of the Western Region and the Front decided to disperse the congress.

On March 3, 1918, a peace treaty was signed in Brest-Litovsk, according to which, in addition to the territory of Western Belarus, which had been under occupation since 1915, the rest of the modern Belarusian territory was transferred to German control.

On March 25, 1918, representatives of the Belarusian national movement announced the creation of an independent Belarusian People's Republic under German occupation. It opened its diplomatic missions in neighboring countries, which recognized its de facto existence. After the withdrawal of the German troops, the territory where the BNR structures functioned was occupied by the Russian SFSR and Poland without resistance, and the BNR government was forced to emigrate to Vilnius.

Notes

References

Belarus–Germany relations
Byelorussia
1910s in Belarus
World War I